is a Japanese fashion model, actress, and tarento.

Career
While attending university, Ito became an exclusive model for the fashion magazine JJ. In 1997, she made her acting debut in the Fuji TV television drama series Hitotsu Yane no Shita 2.

Personal life
Ito was born in Setagaya, Tokyo on 18 April 1974, the second of three daughters. She attended Seijo Gakuen Junior High School and High School and Seijo University, graduating with a Bachelor of Laws in 1997. Ito married a non-celebrity man in October 2011. Their first child was born in March 2012.

Filmography

Film

References

External links
 Hori agency profile 
 Official blog 

Japanese female models
Japanese television personalities
Japanese film actresses
Japanese television actresses
Actresses from Tokyo
1974 births
Living people
Models from Tokyo Metropolis
20th-century Japanese actresses
21st-century Japanese actresses